Sabah National People's Unity Organisation or  (PERPADUAN) is a Sabah-based-opposition party in Malaysia formed after the 2013 Malaysian general election. Following its establishment, the party expresses support for Barisan Nasional (BN) from time to time. It was also a component of the planned Gabungan Rakyat Saksama (SAKSAMA) coalition.

See also
Politics of Malaysia
List of political parties in Malaysia

External links
 Pertubuhan Perpaduan Rakyat Kebangsaan Sabah (PERPADUAN) Facebook

References 

Political parties in Sabah
2013 establishments in Malaysia
Political parties established in 2013